Pouy may refer to:
Pouy, Hautes-Pyrénées, France
Pouy, Burkina Faso
Chan (commune), Cambodia (also called Pouy)
 former name of Saint-Vincent-de-Paul, Landes, France